80th Street – Eastwick Loop, also known as Island Road & Eastwick Avenue   or Eastwick Loop, is a SEPTA trolley terminal station in Philadelphia. It is the western terminus of the SEPTA Subway–Surface Route 36 trolley and is located at Island Avenue near its former intersection with Eastwick Avenue near Interstate 95 in the Eastwick neighborhood of Southwest Philadelphia. The Eastwick station of the SEPTA Regional Rail Airport Line, which serves Philadelphia International Airport, is within walking distance of the station. North of Eastwick Loop, the trolleys travel in an unpaved median parallel to Island Avenue until entering the street at Buist Avenue.

Until April 25, 1975, Route 36 trolleys would continue west along what was called Eastwick Avenue out to 88th Street, where a single counterclockwise loop built in the swamplands. This was originally the routing or former Subway Surface Streetcar Trolley Route 37, which was merged into Route 36 on November 6, 1955.

History
Eastwick Loop in its current form was established during the 1980s. Prior to that point the western terminus of the Route 36 trolley was moved around to several locations in southwestern Philadelphia. Service was cut back to 94th Street & Eastwick Avenue on September 9, 1956, then again to 88th Street on August 15, 1962 then truncated again to its current terminus at 80th Street on April 26, 1975. 

In 1985, Island Avenue was converted into a new bridge over the SEPTA Airport Line near the station, and the intersection of 80th Street and Eastwick Avenue was replaced by a frontage road loop on the north side of the tracks. Today's current trolley loop is located on the northwest corner of this bridge. Some of the former termini of the line are now located within the John Heinz National Wildlife Refuge at Tinicum.

References

External links

SEPTA Subway–Surface Trolley Line stations
Railway stations in Philadelphia